Hezar Khani-ye Olya (also Romanized as Hezār Khānī-ye ‘Olyā and Ḩazār Khānī-ye ‘Olyā; also known as Hazarkham Bala, Hezār Khānī, and Hezār Khānī-ye Bālā) is a village in Bavaleh Rural District, in the Central District of Sonqor County, Kermanshah Province, Iran. At the 2006 census, its population was 561, in 132 families.

References 

Populated places in Sonqor County